The 2008–2009 Israel Football League season was the second season of the Israel Football League (IFL). This was the first season under the IFL's new sponsorship agreement with the Kraft Family, which re-branded itself as the Kraft Family Israel Football League. This was also the inaugural season for both the Jerusalem Kings expansion team and the Pioneers' in their new home of Modi'in after relocating from HaSharon in the off-season. The season concluded with the Modi'in Pioneers defeating the Jerusalem Lions, 32-26 in double overtime, in Israel Bowl II.

Regular season 
The regular season began in November 2008 and consisted of an eight game schedule, with each team playing the others twice during the season. The top four teams at the end of the regular season (Pioneers, Underdogs, Lions and Kings) qualified for the playoffs, with the Kings edging out the Sabres through the IFL points tie-breaker system.

Playoffs 
The semifinals saw the Pioneers defeat the Kings and the Lions upset the Underdogs to set up a match-up between the Pioneers and Lions in Israel Bowl II, which took place on April 3, 2009, at Kraft Family Stadium. Asaf Katz earned Israel Bowl MVP honors for the champion Modi'in Pioneers, who won in double overtime 32-26.

  * Indicates overtime victory

Awards 

 Most Valuable Player: Asaf Katz, LB, Modi'in Pioneers

References 

Israel Football League Seasons